Thomas Sloan (born 24 August 1964), is a Scottish former footballer who played as a striker for several clubs in the Scottish Football League. He is currently the manager of Auchinleck Talbot with whom he has won the Scottish Junior Cup on seven occasions.

Career
Born in Irvine, Sloan began his career at Junior level with his hometown club Annbank United. After a single appearance for Stranraer as a trialist, he joined Ayr United for a spell before dropping back into Junior football with Annbank. Stepping up a second time in 1988, this time to Queen of the South, Sloan later moved to Kilmarnock before joining Stranraer on a permanent basis in 1991 under manager Alex McAnespie. During a successful six years at Stair Park, he made over 200 league appearances, helping the club to the Scottish League Division Two title in 1993–94, and winning the 1996–97 Scottish Challenge Cup. These were Stranraer's first ever league promotion and national cup honour respectively.

Dropping back again to Junior level, he joined Kilwinning Rangers in 1997, winning the Scottish Junior Cup in 1999. Sloan later moved to Ardrossan Winton Rovers, where he played alongside his son Tommy Jr. With his playing career winding down, Sloan was assisting Campbell Money with youth coaching at Ayr United and turned down his first opportunity to become manager of Auchinleck. He eventually joined the club as player-coach in 2003 under Tam McDonald, and stepped up to the managers role the same year. After avoiding relegation in 2003 on the last day of the season, he has guided Talbot to five Scottish Junior Cup victories and five Super League titles, including the league and cup double in 2006 and 2015.

Throughout his career, he has been known by the nickname "Tucker".

Playing honours

Stranraer
Scottish Challenge Cup
 1996–97
Scottish League Division Two
 1993–94

Kilwinning Rangers
Scottish Junior Cup
 1998–99

Managerial honours

Auchinleck Talbot
Scottish Junior Cup
 2006, 2009, 2011, 2013, 2015, 2018, 2019
West Premier Division / Premiership
 2005–06, 2012–13, 2013–14, 2014–15, 2015–16, 2018–19, 2019–20

References

External links

1964 births
Living people
Footballers from Irvine, North Ayrshire
Scottish footballers
Stranraer F.C. players
Ayr United F.C. players
Queen of the South F.C. players
Kilmarnock F.C. players
Association football forwards
Scottish Football League players
Ardrossan Winton Rovers F.C. players
Scottish football managers
Auchinleck Talbot F.C. players
Kilwinning Rangers F.C. players
Annbank United F.C. players
Scottish Junior Football Association managers
Auchinleck Talbot F.C. managers